David Alexander Conway Jr. (January 6, 1945 – January 22, 2008) was an American football placekicker in the National Football League (NFL) who played for the Green Bay Packers. He played college football at University of Texas.

References 

1945 births
2008 deaths
People from Baytown, Texas
Players of American football from Texas
American football placekickers
Texas Longhorns football players
Green Bay Packers players